Elections to Ballymena Borough Council were held on 19 May 1993 on the same day as the other Northern Irish local government elections. The election used four district electoral areas to elect a total of 24 councillors.

Election results

Note: "Votes" are the first preference votes.

Districts summary

|- class="unsortable" align="centre"
!rowspan=2 align="left"|Ward
! % 
!Cllrs
! % 
!Cllrs
! %
!Cllrs
! %
!Cllrs
! %
!Cllrs
!rowspan=2|TotalCllrs
|- class="unsortable" align="center"
!colspan=2 bgcolor="" | UUP
!colspan=2 bgcolor="" | DUP
!colspan=2 bgcolor="" | SDLP
!colspan=2 bgcolor="" | Alliance
!colspan=2 bgcolor="white"| Others
|-
|align="left"|Ballymena North
|bgcolor="40BFF5"|32.2
|bgcolor="40BFF5"|3
|17.4
|1
|13.8
|1
|19.6
|1
|17.0
|1
|7
|-
|align="left"|Ballymena South
|24.7
|2
|bgcolor="#D46A4C"|28.2
|bgcolor="#D46A4C"|3
|17.8
|1
|0.0
|0
|29.3
|1
|7
|-
|align="left"|Bannside
|37.5
|2
|bgcolor="#D46A4C"|48.5
|bgcolor="#D46A4C"|3
|14.0
|0
|0.0
|0
|0.0
|0
|5
|-
|align="left"|Braid
|bgcolor="40BFF5"|65.6
|bgcolor="40BFF5"|3
|34.4
|1
|0.0
|0
|0.0
|0
|0.0
|0
|5
|-
|- class="unsortable" class="sortbottom" style="background:#C9C9C9"
|align="left"| Total
|38.7
|10
|31.7
|9
|11.9
|2
|5.4
|1
|12.3
|2
|24
|-
|}

Districts results

Ballymena North

1993: 3 x UUP, 1 x Alliance, 1 x DUP, 1 x SDLP, 1 x Independent Unionist

Ballymena South

1993: 3 x DUP, 2 x UUP, 1 x SDLP, 1 x Independent Unionist

Bannside

1993: 3 x DUP, 2 x UUP

Braid

1993: 3 x UUP, 2 x DUP

References

Ballymena Borough Council elections
Ballymena